The 2023 Saudi Tour was a road cycling stage race that took place between 30 January and 3 February 2023 in Saudi Arabia. The race is rated as a category 2.1 event on the 2023 UCI Asia Tour calendar, and is the seventh edition of the Saudi Tour.

Teams 
Made up of 16 cycling teams, only five teams did not enter seven riders; four teams entered six riders each, while the Saudi Arabian national team registered only 5 riders. In total, 106 riders started the race.

UCI WorldTeams

 
 
 
 
 
 
 

UCI ProTeams

 
 
 
 
 
 

UCI Continental Teams

 
 

National team
 Saudi Arabia

Route

Stages

Stage 1 
30 January 2023 — AIUIa International Airport to Khaybar,

Stage 2 
31 January 2023 — Winter Park to Shalal Sijlyat Rocks,

Stage 3 
1 February 2023 — Al Manshiyah Train Station > Abu Rakah,

Stage 4 
2 February 2023 — Maraya > Skyviews of Harrat Uwayrid,

Stage 5 
3 February 2023 — AIUIa Old Town > Maraya,

Classification leadership table

Final classification standings

General classification

Points classification

Young rider classification

Team classification

References

External links 
 

2023
Saudi Tour
Saudi Tour
January 2023 sports events in Saudi Arabia
February 2023 sports events in Saudi Arabia